Terror and Black Lace (Spanish: Terror y encajes negros) is a 1985 Mexican film directed by Luis Alcoriza.

External links
 

1985 films
Mexican slasher films
Mexican thriller films
1980s Spanish-language films
Films directed by Luis Alcoriza
1985 thriller films
1980s slasher films
1980s Mexican films